Florence Hayward is the name of:

Florence Hayward (1858–1939), a South Australian poet, pen name "Firenze"
Florence Hayward (writer), St. Louis author